Greg Kimmerly (born December 8, 1964 in Toronto, Ontario) is a retired National Hockey League referee who is currently the Director of Officiating in the Elite Ice Hockey League. Kimmerly was an NHL official from the 1993-94 NHL season to 2016, his final game being the Detroit Red Wings vs Toronto Maple Leafs on April 2, 2016. Kimmerly wore the number 18.

Kimmerly is currently the Director of Officiating in the UK's EIHL.

References

1964 births
Ice hockey people from Toronto
Living people
National Hockey League officials